Aage Nielsen-Edwin (17 July 1898 – 19 October 1985) was a Danish sculptor. His work was part of the sculpture event in the art competition at the 1936 Summer Olympics. He was awarded the Eckersberg Medal in 1943.

References

1898 births
1985 deaths
20th-century Danish sculptors
20th-century male artists
Olympic competitors in art competitions
People from Copenhagen